Before the Eulogy is a collection of B-sides and rarities by Delaware-based band, Boysetsfire. It includes the complete Consider 7" (1996) and In Chrysalis EP (1998).

Track listing
"One Subject Notebook" – 2:59
"Parasite Candy" – 3:20
"Three Lefts" – 2:36
"Harlot" – 3:22
"Vehicle" – 3:21
"The Burning Of" – 2:55
"Turn The Key" – 3:56
"Consider The Numbers" – 2:15
"Feudal" – 2:33
"Voice Over" – 1:47
"The Tyranny Of What Everyone Knows" – 2:38
"Loser Of The Year Award" – 3:12
"Cavity" – 2:50
"Holiday In Cambodia" – 3:42
"Suckerpunch Training" – 4:23
"Rocket Man" – 4:17
"No Time Safe" – 4:19
"Bucket Of Rain" – 4:26
"With Cold Eyes" – 2:50
"Fashion As A Weapon" – 2:06

Although the album states that the Rocket Man song should be the Elton John cover, it is instead the song "Timothy" from the After the Eulogy reissue CD. The real version of this song can be found on the Suckerpunch Training CD.

References

Boysetsfire albums
B-side compilation albums
2005 compilation albums
Equal Vision Records compilation albums